Bertram Trevor Lloyd (born 15 February 1938) is an Anglican priest and author.

Lloyd was educated at Highgate School and Hertford College, Oxford. He was ordained in 1964 and began his career with a curacy at Christ Church, Barnet and held incumbencies at Holy Trinity, Wealdstone and St Michael, Harrow until his archdeacon’s appointment. He was Archdeacon of Barnstaple from 1989 until his retirement in 2002.

Selected works
Selected works by Lloyd:
 Informal Liturgy (1972)
 Lay Presidency at the Eucharist? (1977) 
 Celebrating Lent, Holy Week and Easter (1985)
 A Service of the Word (1999)
 How to Share the Leadership of Worship (2009)

References

1938 births
People educated at Highgate School
Alumni of Hertford College, Oxford
Archdeacons of Barnstaple
Living people